Buffalo Municipal Airport  is a city-owned, public-use airport located two miles (3 km) north of the central business district of Buffalo, a city in Harper County, Oklahoma, United States.

Although most U.S. airports use the same three-letter location identifier for the FAA and IATA, this airport is assigned BFK by the FAA but has no designation from the IATA.

Facilities and aircraft 
For the 12-month period ending January 3, 2008, the airport had 200 general aviation aircraft operations, an average of 17 per month.

References

External links 
 
 

Airports in Oklahoma